Satyendra Singh (born 7 March 1964) is an Indian former cricketer. He played nineteen first-class matches for Bengal between 1986 and 1991.

See also
 List of Bengal cricketers

References

External links
 

1964 births
Living people
Indian cricketers
Bengal cricketers
Cricketers from Patna